Joanne Verger is an Oregon Democratic politician and the first female mayor of Coos Bay, the largest city on the Oregon Coast, serving four terms. She served in the Oregon House of Representatives from 2001 to 2004, and was elected to the Oregon State Senate in 2004. She was reelected in 2008 with no major party opponent in either the primary or general election.

In October 2011 Verger announced that she would not run for reelection to the Senate.

She is co-owner of an automobile dealership, and has worked extensively in advertising and marketing.

She is a graduate of Amite High School (Louisiana), Northwestern State University, and Louisiana State University.

See also 
 Seventy-third Oregon Legislative Assembly (2005–2007)
 Seventy-fourth Oregon Legislative Assembly (2007–2009)
 Seventy-fifth Oregon Legislative Assembly (2009–2011)

References

External links 
 Official web site
Follow the Money - Joanne Verger
2010 2008 2006 2004 2002 2000  campaign contributions

Living people
Women mayors of places in Oregon
Louisiana State University alumni
Mayors of places in Oregon
Members of the Oregon House of Representatives
Northwestern State University alumni
Oregon state senators
People from Coos Bay, Oregon
People from Amite City, Louisiana
Women state legislators in Oregon
Year of birth missing (living people)
21st-century American politicians
21st-century American women politicians